James Forrest is an Australian actor who worked in Hollywood. He was a journalist before going into acting, his first film role being Australian film Dust in the Sun in 1958.

Select credits
Dust in the Sun (1958)
 Sea Hunt (1961) – Season 4, Episode 27
Perry Mason (TV series) Season 5, Episode 6: The Case of THE MEDDLING MEDIUM (1961), Season 6, Episode 6: The Case of the Dodging Domino (1962), Season 7, Episode 8:  The Case of the Floating Stones (1963).
Nightmare in Wax (1969)
McHale's Navy--Season 1, Episode 26, as Lieutenant Crandall
McHale's Navy--Season 3, Episode 2, as Lieutenant Crowder

References

External links

Year of birth missing
Possibly living people
Australian male film actors